Capilano Bridge may refer to:
 Capilano Bridge (Edmonton), a freeway bridge in Edmonton, Alberta across the North Saskatchewan River
 Capilano Suspension Bridge, a pedestrian suspension bridge in North Vancouver, British Columbia across the Capilano River